Fernanda Andrielli Nascimento Dos Santos (born in São Paulo, October 7, 1998), known professionally as MC Dricka, is a Brazilian singer-songwriter whose music consists mostly of the dirty funk genre. 

She earned the nickname "Rainha dos Fluxos (Queen of Flows)" for her success at favelas parties in São Paulo. Dricka is known for her aggressive music and direct lyrics, written with the purpose of elevating women's self-esteem. She is also recognized for being one of the first break-out woman artists in a male-dominated space. She is known as one of the empowering voices and advocates of funk music, famous for popularizing the rhythm of São Paulo's favelas throughout Brazil and the world.

Career 

On June 11, 2019, she released the single “Empurra Empurra" with DJ Will DF. The song was an overnight success, accumulating about 20,000 views on YouTube in a single day, and was responsible for launching her fame throughout Brazil. Since then, Dricka has continuous to release singles that are successful in the funk balls of the favelas of São Paulo. Her biggest hit has been "Empurra Empurra" and she has currently accumulated over 60 million streams and 200 million views on YouTube as of June 2022. MC Dricka was nominated for Best New International Act at the 2021 BET Awards. It was the singer's first nomination for the award.

Personal life 
Dricka was born and raised in the north zone of São Paulo and also spent part of her childhood in Sergipe. She is openly LGBT and is married to model Larissa Novais. Since she was a teenager, she has been engaged in social movements, and she is known for her feminist lyrics, and for promoting social, racial and gender equality. She has been also a public supporter of Lula for president in the 2022 Brazilian general elections.

Discography

Extended plays

Singles

As lead artist 

 "Empurra Empurra" (Push, Push)
 '"38 Carregado"
 "Vai Fazer Carão"
 "Bate Bate"
 "Pretinha do Peitin e do Bundão"
 "Me Olha e Me Respeita"
 "E Nós Tem Um Charme Que É Da Hora"

As featured artist 

 Pancada (with Mateus Carrilho)

Awards and nominations

References 

1998 births
Living people
Afro-Brazilian feminists
LGBT Afro-Brazilians
Lesbian feminists
Feminist musicians
Afro-Brazilian women singers
Brazilian women pop singers
Musicians from São Paulo
People from São Paulo
Brazilian people of African descent
Brazilian women composers
Brazilian women singer-songwriters
Brazilian LGBT singers
Brazilian LGBT songwriters
Funk carioca musicians
21st-century Brazilian women singers
Singers from São Paulo
LGBT people in Latin music
Women in Latin music
Lesbian singers
Lesbian songwriters